Pan de coco, literally "coconut bread" in Spanish, is a Filipino rich sweet roll that uses sweetened shredded coconut meat (bukayo) as filling.

See also
Asado roll
Pandesal
Pan de monja (Monáy)

References 

Sweet breads
Breads
Foods containing coconut
Philippine breads
Southeast Asian breads